This is a list English words of Polish origin, that is words used in the English language that were borrowed or derived, either directly or indirectly, from Polish. Several Polish words have entered English slang via Yiddish, brought by Ashkenazi Jews migrating from Poland to North America. Other English words were indirectly derived from Polish via Russian, French, German or Dutch. The Polish words themselves often come from other languages, such as German or Turkish. Borrowings from Polish tend to be mostly words referring to staples of Polish cuisine, names of Polish folk dances or specialist, e.g. horse-related, terminology. Among the words of Polish origin there are several words that derive from Polish geographic names and ethnonyms, including the name Polska, "Poland", itself.

Derived from common words

Directly 
The following words are derive directly from Polish. Some of them are loanwords in Polish itself.

Indirectly
The following words are derived from Polish via third languages.

Derived from geographic names and ethnonyms

See also 
 List of English words of German origin
 List of English words of Russian origin
 List of English words of Turkish origin
 List of English words of Yiddish origin
 Lists of English words of international origin

References

Sources
 AHD,  (included in Dictionary.com)
 EB-1911, 
 OED, 
 MW, 

 English
Polish
English